
Gmina Wola Uhruska is a rural gmina (administrative district) in Włodawa County, Lublin Voivodeship, in eastern Poland, on the border with Ukraine.

Villages
Gmina Wola Uhruska contains the villages and settlements of: 

 Bytyń 
 Huta
 Józefów
 Kosyń
 Łan
 Macoszyn Duży
 Majdan Stuleński
 Małoziemce
 Mszanka
 Mszanna
 Mszanna-Kolonia
 Nadbużanka
 Piaski
 Piaski Uhruskie
 Potoki
 Przymiarki
 Siedliszcze
 Sołtysy
 Stanisławów
 Stare Stulno
 Stulno
 Uhrusk
 Wola Uhruska
 Zagóra
 Zastawie
 Zbereże

Neighbouring gminas
Gmina Wola Uhruska is bordered by the gminas of Hańsk, Ruda-Huta, Sawin and Włodawa. It also borders Ukraine.

References
Polish official population figures 2006

Wola Uhruska
Włodawa County